Protenor is a genus of broad-headed bugs in the family Alydidae. There are at least three described species in Protenor.

Species
These three species belong to the genus Protenor:
 Protenor australis Hussey, 1925
 Protenor belfragei Haglund, 1868
 Protenor tropicalis Distant, 1881

References

Further reading

External links

Micrelytrinae
Articles created by Qbugbot
Pentatomomorpha genera